USS Dwight D. Eisenhower (CVN-69) (known informally as "Ike") is a nuclear-powered aircraft carrier currently in service with the United States Navy. Commissioned in 1977, the ship is the second of the ten s currently in service, and is the first ship named after the 34th President of the United States and General of the Army Dwight D. Eisenhower. The vessel was initially named simply as USS Eisenhower, much like the lead ship of the class, but the name was changed to its present form on 25 May 1970. The carrier, like all others of her class, was constructed at Newport News Shipbuilding Company in Virginia, with the same design as the lead ship, although the ship has been overhauled twice to bring her up to the standards of those constructed more recently.

Since commissioning, Dwight D. Eisenhower has participated in deployments including, the Gulf War in the 1990s, and more recently in support of U.S. military operations in Iraq and Afghanistan. The carrier currently serves as the flagship of Carrier Strike Group 2.

Design and construction

On 29 June 1970, then-Northrop Grumman Newport News of Newport News, Virginia, was awarded the contract for construction. On 30 June 1975, her designation was changed from CVAN-69 to CVN-69. She was laid down as hull number 599 on 15 August 1970 at Newport News shipyard at a cost of $679 million ($ billion in  dollars), launched 11 October 1975 after christening by Mamie Doud Eisenhower, Dwight Eisenhower's widow, and commissioned 18 October 1977, Captain William E. Ramsey in command. On commissioning, she replaced the aging World War II-era carrier  in the fleet.

Service history

1970s
Dwight D. Eisenhower was initially assigned to the United States Atlantic Fleet, and, after receiving over a year of training, the ship was visited by President Jimmy Carter with his wife Rosalynn Carter, Defense Secretary Harold Brown and National Security Advisor Zbigniew Brzeziński. In January 1979, she sailed for her first deployment to the Mediterranean Sea. During this deployment, while off the coast of Israel, Israeli Prime Minister Menachem Begin visited Dwight D. Eisenhower, The carrier returned to Norfolk Naval Station in July of the same year.

1980s

Under the command of her second Commanding Officer, Captain James H. Mauldin, her second deployment occurred in 1980, when she was dispatched by President Carter to the Indian Ocean, in response to the Iran hostage crisis. She relieved sister-carrier Nimitz three days after the Iranian hostage rescue attempt. To help maintain morale, Captain Mauldin allowed the men aboard to participate in "Flight Deck Olympics". The Navy also authorized a special ration of beer, consisting of six cans per man, which was dispensed over a two-month period.

Dwight D. Eisenhower returned to the Mediterranean Sea for her third deployment, under the command of her third Captain E. W. Clexton Jr., from 5 January to 13 July 1982. During this deployment, 11 passengers and crew were lost when Mamie, her onboard logistics aircraft, crashed near Souda Bay, Crete, on 2 April. She also participated in the 24 June evacuation of the U.S. Embassy staff from Beirut, Lebanon, as that country descended into civil war.

Ike embarked on her fourth deployment from 27 April to 2 December 1983. In addition to several major exercises with NATO, Egyptian and U.S. Air Force personnel and assets, she came under direct threat of attack as Libyan dictator Muammar al-Qadhafi vowed to turn the Gulf of Sidra into a "red gulf of blood" should the ship enter the zone claimed by Libya. Further tensions between Libya, Chad, Sudan, and Egypt forced Ike to be ordered to the disputed area. Between 2 and 5 August, the ship's Combat Air Patrol intercepted two MiG-23 Flogger and two Dassault-Breguet Mirage 5 aircraft headed toward the carrier in separate engagements. The Libyan aircraft immediately turned back toward their bases, ending both incidents. Diplomatic measures deflated the crisis days later. On 26 August, Ike sailed within sight of the embattled city of Beirut, Lebanon. The ship launched reconnaissance sorties in support of the U.S. Marines and other international peacekeepers coming under attack ashore. After 93 days at sea since her previous port visit, Ike visited Italy on 21 October. She once again had to make speed toward Beirut, just five days later on the 26th, because of suicide attacks that killed nearly 300 American and French troops on 23 October.

In May and June 1984, for the 40th anniversary of D-Day, Ike was deployed to Normandy, France and Portsmouth, England. The port visit in England included a visit from Queen Elizabeth II. After her fifth deployment Dwight D. Eisenhower went into Newport News Shipbuilding and Drydock in October 1985 for a major overhaul. The 18-month yard period included the addition of the Close-in Weapons System (CIWS), NATO Sea Sparrow Missile System, Naval Tactical Data System, anti-submarine warfare module, communications upgrades and rehabilitation of 1,831 berths in 25 compartments. She re-entered the fleet in April 1987.

On 29 February 1988, Ike started her sixth deployment to the Mediterranean. While returning to Norfolk, on 29 August 1988, she collided with an anchored Spanish bulk carrier, the Urduliz, while entering the harbor to dock at Norfolk Naval Station when wind and currents pushed the carrier off course, but only caused minor damage to both ships. Dwight D. Eisenhower entered Norfolk Naval Shipyard (Portsmouth, Virginia) in September 1988; she returned to the fleet in April 1989.

1990s

In 1990, Dwight D. Eisenhower completed her seventh Mediterranean deployment. The deployment became a commemorative event in the worldwide "Dwight D. Eisenhower Centennial", celebrating the 100th anniversary of the late president's birth. During D-Day anniversary ceremonies off the coast of Normandy, President Eisenhower's son John Eisenhower and D-Day veterans embarked in the ship, while Carrier Air Wing Seven conducted a memorial flyover of the American cemetery at Omaha Beach in Normandy, France.

Gulf War
In response to Iraq's invasion of Kuwait, Dwight D. Eisenhower became the first carrier to conduct sustained operations in the Red Sea, and only the second nuclear-powered aircraft carrier ever to transit the Suez Canal. Ike served as a ready striking force in the event Iraq invaded Saudi Arabia, and participated in maritime interception operations in support of a United Nations embargo against Iraq.

After completion of an extensive shipyard period and work-up, the carrier deployed 26 September 1991 to the Persian Gulf to continue multi-national operations with coalition forces in support of Operation Desert Storm. Ike returned to Norfolk on 2 April 1992, and, on 12 January 1993, entered Norfolk Naval Shipyard for overhaul and conversion, returning to the fleet 12 November 1993.

Post–Gulf War

In September 1994, Dwight D. Eisenhower and elements of the U.S. 10th Mountain Division first tested the concept of adaptive force packaging. The division's soldiers and equipment were loaded on board, and the ship's Army/Navy team headed for Port-au-Prince to lead Operation Uphold Democracy, the U.S.-led effort to restore the elected government of Haiti.

One month later, in October 1994, Dwight D. Eisenhower departed for a six-month deployment which included flying missions in support of Operation Southern Watch and Operation Deny Flight. This deployment marked the first time that women had deployed as crew members of a U.S. Navy combatant. Dwight D. Eisenhower, Carrier Air Wing Three (CVW-3), and the Commander, Cruiser-Destroyer Group 8 staff team included more than 400 women. The integration of women caused some negative headlines for the Navy. During the deployment, 15 women serving aboard had to be reassigned ashore because of pregnancy, earning the ship the nickname The Love Boat. There was also a case of a sailor who filmed himself having sex with a female.

Dwight D. Eisenhower returned to Newport News Shipbuilding on 17 July 1995 for an 18-month complex overhaul, completed on 27 January 1997. Among other upgrades, they installed a new Advanced combat direction system. The ship departed on her 10th deployment on 10 June 1998 and returned in December. In February 1999, she returned to the Norfolk Navy Shipyard for a six-month refitting and returned to the fleet in June. Upon completion in June 1999, she returned to full duty in the fleet.

2000s

Deploying in February 2000 and returning that August on the "Millennium Cruise", for the first time Ikes embarked aircraft dropped ordnance in combat while enforcing Operation Southern Watch's No-Fly Zone over Iraq.

She visited Naples, Italy, and then Limassol, Cyprus, for three days in October 2006 before departing to the east. She entered the Persian Gulf in December 2006.

On 8 January 2007, a U.S. AC-130 gunship based out of Djibouti was dispatched to target Al-Qaeda operatives located in Somalia. Dwight D. Eisenhower was deployed in the Indian Ocean to provide air cover for the operation and, if needed, to evacuate downed airmen and other casualties. She joined other U.S. and allied vessels from Combined Task Force 150 (CTF-150), based out of Bahrain. A U.S. spokesperson did not say which particular ships comprised the cordon, but the task force included vessels from Canada, France, Germany, Pakistan, the UK and the US. The aim of CTF-150's patrols is to "... stop SICC leaders or foreign militant supporters escaping" Somalia. In March 2007, following the Iranian seizure of Royal Navy personnel, Dwight D. Eisenhower began battle group exercises off the Iranian coastline. The following month, in April, the ship was relieved by Nimitz.

On 4 October 2008 Dwight D. Eisenhower Petty Officer 2nd Class Robert Lemar Robinson was killed aboard ship during training exercises off the coast of North Carolina. The sailor was struck and mortally wounded, by an airplane at 8:15 p.m. on the carrier's flight deck.

On 21 February 2009, Dwight D. Eisenhower deployed for the Arabian Sea and environs rotating into the forward-deployed forces there. She served as the flagship of Carrier Strike Group 8 commanded by Rear Admiral Kurt W. Tidd. Also embarked was Carrier Air Wing 7 and the staff of Commander, Destroyer Squadron 28. In addition to supporting Operations Iraqi Freedom and Enduring Freedom, the strike group conducted maritime security operations including anti-piracy operations. On 16 May, Dwight D. Eisenhower became the first Nimitz-class carrier to dock pier-side in Manama, Bahrain. On 30 July 2009, Dwight D. Eisenhower returned to Naval Station Norfolk after an almost six-month-long deployment.

2010s 

On 2 January 2010, Dwight D. Eisenhower again deployed to the U.S. 5th and 6th Fleet areas of operation in the Middle East. She served as the flagship of the Dwight D. Eisenhower Carrier Strike Group commanded by Rear Admiral Philip S. Davidson. While in theater, the strike group provided security cooperation, forward naval presence, maritime security, and crisis response. On 28 July 2010, Ike returned to her homeport in Norfolk.

The ship was placed in a planned incremental availability at Norfolk Naval Shipyard from September 2010 through June 2011. The ship was deployed again 7 June 2012 to the Middle East in support of Operation Enduring Freedom. The ship returned to homeport 19 December 2012. On 22 February 2013, Ike and Strike Group 8 departed for another Mediterranean and Mid-East deployment. After pulling into Marseille, France in early March, the German   became the first to fully integrate into an American strike group. Hamburg, commanded by Commander (FKpt) Ralf Kuchler (GN), remained with the strike group while it operated with the 5th fleet. The ship returned to homeport 3 July 2013. On 6 August the ship began an ammunition offload in preparation for an upcoming docked planned incremental availability (DPIA) at Norfolk Naval Shipyard. On 26 August 2014, the ship was moved to Berth 42-43 from Dry Dock #8 at Norfolk Naval Shipyard, and as of 4 February 2015, the DPIA was four months behind schedule, with the ship planned to remain in the yard until at least April 2015. On 3 September 2015, the ship went back to sea.

On 8 June 2016, Dwight D. Eisenhower and her Carrier Strike Group sailed the Atlantic Ocean into the U.S. 6th Fleet's area of operations (AoR) in support of U.S. national security interests in Europe. On 22 November 2016, Military Times reported that since June 2016, when the ship entered the Persian Gulf after launching strikes from the eastern Mediterranean, the carrier's Captain, Paul Spedero, reported that sorties from Dwight D. Eisenhower had dropped nearly 1,100 bombs on ISIS targets in Iraq and Syria. Ike returned to homeport Norfolk 30 December.

On 18 March 2016, while she was sailing off the coast of Virginia, eight members of her deck crew were injured when the arresting gear cables failed and "came apart", during the routine landing of an E-2 Hawkeye aircraft. Six of the injured deck crew were flown by helicopter to nearby shore-based hospitals, while the other two remained and were treated aboard ship. None of the eight suffered life-threatening injuries. The Hawkeye immediately resumed flight and landed safely at Chambers Field, Norfolk Naval Station, with no reports of injuries to her crew or damage to the aircraft.

In December 2016, the ship completed her 17th deployment to the Mediterranean and the Persian Gulf in support of Operation Inherent Resolve.

2020s
On 13 January 2020, Dwight D. Eisenhower left Norfolk for her Composite Training Unit Exercise ahead of deploying. After exercising with Carrier Strike Group 10 until late February, Dwight D. Eisenhower immediately deployed to the Persian Gulf without returning to port, due to Dynamic Force Employment (DFE), a strategy to help make naval deployments less predictive.

On 26 June 2020, the ship surpassed the 's record of 160 consecutive days at sea without a port call by reaching its 161st day. This new mark is attributed to the COVID-19 pandemic and the ship's operational commitment to "remain clean" by avoiding any contact with ports that carried the potential of introducing the novel coronavirus into the crew. On 25 and 26 July 2020, the Hellenic Air Force (HAF) co-trained with USS Dwight D. Eisenhower southeast of Crete.

On 3 March 2021, Dwight D. Eisenhowers Strike Group conducted Exercise Lightning Handshake with Royal Moroccan Navy frigate Tarik Ben Zayid and Royal Moroccan Air Force fighter jets. On 5 March,  underwent alongside her in the Strait of Gibraltar.

On 2 April 2021, Dwight D. Eisenhower, with Carrier Air Wing 3 and her Carrier Strike Group, transited the Suez Canal into the Red Sea in support of Operation Inherent Resolve.

Overhauls 

 March 1978 to July 1978 - Post Shakedown Availability
 January 1981 to May 1981 - Selected Restricted Availability
 August 1982 to October 1982 - Selected Restricted Availability
 October 1985 to April 1987 - Complex Overhaul - forward port sponson added; Mk-25 BPDM replaced with Mk-29; 3 CIWS added; SPS-49 search radar replaces SPS-43.
 October 1988 to March 1989 - Selected Restricted Availability
 October 1990 to January 1991 - Selected Restricted Availability
 January 1993 to November 1993 - Selected Restricted Availability
 October 1995 to January 1997 - Complex Overhaul - aft boarding dock added.
 February 1999 to June 1999 - Planned Incremental Availability
 May 2001 to March 2005 - Refueling and Complex Overhaul - bridle catcher removed; top two levels of island replaced; new antenna mast; new radar tower; 2 RAM replace 1 CIWS/1 Mk-29 at forward port sponson/aft starboard sponson; 2 CIWS at island/stern removed.
 January 2008 to July 2008 - Planned Incremental Availability 
 September 2010 to June 2011 - Planned Incremental Availability
 September 2013 to May 2015 - Planned Incremental Availability - 2 CIWS added; one on newly installed forward starboard sponson, one on newly installed aft port sponson.
 August 2017 to November 2018 - Planned Incremental Availability
 September 2021 to October 2022 - Planned Incremental Availability

Eventual replacement 
Dwight D. Eisenhower is scheduled to be eventually replaced around 2029 by the new , a  carrier, that as of fall 2018, is in the steel cutting and fabrication stages of construction. The exact date of the ship's inactivation and decommissioning will likely depend on many factors, including Defense Department funding considerations.

Awards
Dwight D. Eisenhower has earned a number of awards, including the Battle "E" in 1979, 1980, 1981, 1985, 1990, 1998, 1999, 2006, 2012 and 2022 as the most battle efficient carrier in the Atlantic Fleet. In 1999, she won the Marjorie Sterrett Battleship Fund Award for the Atlantic Fleet.

See also 
 List of aircraft carriers of the United States Navy
 List of aircraft carriers (worldwide)
 U.S. Navy Numbered Fleets
 Carrier Strike Group
 Carrier air wing

Citations

References

External links 

 USS Dwight D. Eisenhower official site
 Story archive – U.S. Navy – USS Dwight D. Eisenhower (CVN-69)
 Eisenhower bolsters US security presence off Somalia Jane's Navy International, January 2007
 Dwight D. Eisenhower Sea Stories home page
 Dwight D. Eisenhower Reunion −2008 home page
 USS Dwight D. Eisenhower webpage
Maritimequest USS Dwight D. Eisenhower CVN-69 Photo Gallery
 USS Dwight D. Eisenhower history at U.S. Carriers
 USS Dwight D. Eisenhower (CVN-69) command histories – Naval History & Heritage Command

1975 ships
Aircraft carriers of the United States
Cold War aircraft carriers of the United States
Nimitz-class aircraft carriers
Nuclear ships of the United States Navy
Ships built in Newport News, Virginia